Adjei is a surname.
 Notable people with the surname include:

 Daniel Adjei (born 1995), footballer for Hashtag United
 David Adjei (born 1977), Ghanaian footballer
 Eric Adjei (born 1984), Ghanaian footballer
 Francis Adjei, Ghanaian footballer
 Joseph Adjei (born 1995), Ghanaian footballer
 Lawrence Adjei (born 1979), Ghanaian footballer
 Mamé Adjei (born 1991), Ghanaian-American model
 Mavis Adjei, Ghanaian actor
 Natey Adjei (born 1989), Canadian football player
 Richard Adjei (born 1983), German bobsledder
 Sammi Adjei (born 1973), Ghanaian footballer
 Sammy Adjei (born 1980), Ghanaian footballer
 Samuel Adjei (born 1992), Swedish footballer
 Simon Adjei (born 1993), Swedish footballer

See also 
 Ebenezer Ako-Adjei (1916–2002), Ghanaian politician
 Akwasi Osei-Adjei, Ghanaian politician
 Andrews Adjei-Yeboah, Ghanaian politician
 Agyei
 Adji (disambiguation)
 Emmanuel-Collopy Adjei, Ghanaian citizen

References 

Ghanaian surnames